Olga Kamyshleeva (born 21 April 1973, Minsk) is a Dutch/Belarus international draughts player, 2003 Women's World Champion, she took silver in 1993 (shared with Elena Chitaykina from Russia) and bronze in 1997 and 2015. Then played World Draughts Championship match with Natalia Sadowska from Poland.

She emigrated to the Netherlands in 1996.

Participation in World and European Championships

* took 2-3 place with  Elena Chitaykina

** took 2-3 place with  Ewa Schalley-Minkina, additional match 4:8

References 

1973 births
Living people
Belarusian draughts players
Dutch draughts players
Soviet draughts players
Players of international draughts
Sportspeople from Minsk